Brampton Plantation was a plantation originally founded in colonial Savannah, Province of Georgia. It has been closely associated with Jonathan Bryan, a landowner, patriot and an associate of James Edward Oglethorpe, the founder of the Savannah colony. Bryan owned it from 1765. The plantation was located between National Gypsum Company and Union Camp Corporation, about 3.5 miles northwest of downtown Savannah on the Savannah River. A cemetery also exists on the land.

For fifteen years after the 1733 foundation of the Savannah colony, the land was part of an Indian reservation; in 1757, the land was divided up and allotted to planters. David Graham was the first owner of the section that became Brampton.

John Garnier Williamson, a slaveholder, was the owner of Brampton when his probate inventory was recorded in 1814.  His son, John Postell Williamson, owned the plantation after his father died.

References

African-American history in Savannah, Georgia
Plantations in Georgia (U.S. state)
Province of Georgia
1748 establishments in the Thirteen Colonies